25th New York Film Critics Circle Awards
January 23, 1960(announced December 28, 1959)

Ben-Hur
The 25th New York Film Critics Circle Awards, honored the best filmmaking of 1959.

Winners
Best Film:
Ben-Hur
Best Actor:
James Stewart - Anatomy of a Murder
Best Actress:
Audrey Hepburn - The Nun's Story
Best Director:
Fred Zinnemann - The Nun's Story
Best Screenplay:
Wendell Mayes - Anatomy of a Murder
Best Foreign Language Film:
The 400 Blows (Les quatre cents coups) • France

References

External links
1959 Awards

1959
New York Film Critics Circle Awards, 1959
New York Film Critics Circle Awards
New York Film Critics Circle Awards
New York Film Critics Circle Awards
New York Film Critics Circle Awards